Niall Finnegan (born 1971) is an Irish retired Gaelic footballer. His league and championship career with the Galway senior team spanned ten seasons from 1991 until 2001.

Career statistics

Honours

 Galway
 All-Ireland Senior Football Championship (1): 1998
 Connacht Senior Football Championship (3): 1995, 1998, 2000

References

1971 births
Living people
Alumni of the University of Galway
Galway inter-county Gaelic footballers
Irish solicitors
University of Galway Gaelic footballers
Salthill-Knocknacarra Gaelic footballers
St Sylvester's Gaelic footballers